is a Japanese weightlifter. He competed in the men's flyweight event at the 1996 Summer Olympics.

References

1971 births
Living people
Japanese male weightlifters
Olympic weightlifters of Japan
Weightlifters at the 1996 Summer Olympics
Sportspeople from Kobe
Asian Games medalists in weightlifting
Weightlifters at the 1994 Asian Games
Weightlifters at the 1998 Asian Games
Asian Games bronze medalists for Japan
Medalists at the 1994 Asian Games
20th-century Japanese people
21st-century Japanese people